Daniele Giorgini (born 24 April 1984) is an Italian professional tennis player.

ATP Challenger and ITF Futures finals

Singles: 28 (15–13)

Doubles: 56 (33–23)

References

External links
 
 

Italian male tennis players
Living people
1984 births
21st-century Italian people